Vladimír Peška (born 28 September 1985) is a former Czech football player who played in the Czech First League.

References

External links
 
 

1985 births
Living people
Czech footballers
Czech Republic youth international footballers
Czech Republic under-21 international footballers
Association football forwards
Czech First League players
FC Vysočina Jihlava players
SK Sigma Olomouc players